

QI06A Cat

QI06AA Inactivated viral vaccines
QI06AA01 Feline leukaemia virus
QI06AA02 Feline panleukopenia virus/parvovirus
QI06AA03 Rabies virus + feline rhinotracheitis virus + feline calicivirus
QI06AA04 Feline rhinotracheitis virus + feline calicivirus + feline panleucopenia virus/parvovirus
QI06AA05 Feline rhinotracheitis virus + feline calicivirus
QI06AA06 Feline infectious peritonitis virus
QI06AA07 Feline calicivirus
QI06AA08 Feline rhinotracheitis virus
QI06AA09 Feline panleukopenia virus + feline calcivirus + feline rhinotracheitis virus + rabies virus
QI06AA10 Feline immunodeficiency virus

QI06AB Inactivated bacterial vaccines (including mycoplasma, toxoid and chlamydia)
Empty group

QI06AC Inactivated bacterial vaccines and antisera
QI06AC01 Chlamydia vaccine
QI06AC02 Bordetella vaccine

QI06AD Live viral vaccines
QI06AD01 Feline panleucopenia virus/parvovirus
QI06AD02 Feline infectious peritonitis virus
QI06AD03 Feline rhinotracheitis virus + feline calicivirus
QI06AD04 Feline panleucopenia virus/parvovirus + feline rhinotracheitis virus + feline calicivirus
QI06AD05 Feline panleucopenia virus/parvovirus + feline rhinotracheitis virus
QI06AD06 Feline parapox virus
QI06AD07 Feline leukaemia recombinant live canarypox virus
QI06AD08 Rabies, recombinant live canarypox virus

QI06AE Live bacterial vaccines
QI06AE01 Chlamydia
QI06AE02 Bordetella

QI06AF Live bacterial and viral vaccines
QI06AF01 Feline panleucopenia virus/parvovirus + feline rhinotracheitis virus + feline calicivirus + chlamydia

QI06AG Live and inactivated bacterial vaccines
Empty group

QI06AH Live and inactivated viral vaccines
QI06AH01 Live feline rhinotracheitis virus + live feline calicivirus + inactivated feline panleucopenia virus/parvovirus
QI06AH02 Live feline panleucopenia virus/parvovirus + inactivated rabies virus
QI06AH03 Live feline rhinotracheitis virus + inactivated feline panleucopenia virus/parvovirus
QI06AH04 Live feline panleucopenia virus/parvovirus + inactivated rabies virus + inactivated feline rhinotracheitis virus + inactivated feline calicivirus
QI06AH05 Live feline panleucopenia virus/parvovirus + live feline rhinotracheitis virus + live feline calicivirus + inactivated rabies virus
QI06AH06 Live feline panleucopenia virus/parvovirus + inactivated feline rhinotracheitis virus + inactivated feline calicivirus
QI06AH07 Live feline panleucopenia virus/parvovirus + live feline rhinotracheitis virus + live feline calicivirus + inactivated feline leukaemia virus
QI06AH08 Live feline rhinotracheitis virus + inactivated feline calicivirus antigen
QI06AH09 Live feline rhinotracheitis virus + live feline panleucopenia virus/parvovirus + inactivated feline calicivirus antigen
QI06AH10 Live feline rhinotracheitis virus + live feline panleucopenia virus/parvovirus + inactivated feline calicivirus + feline leukaemia recombinant live canarypox virus

QI06AI Live viral and inactivated bacterial vaccines
QI06AI01 Live feline panleucopenia virus/parvovirus + live feline rhinotracheitis virus + live feline calicivirus + inactivated chlamydia
QI06AI02 Live feline rhinotracheitis virus + live feline calicivirus + inactivated chlamydia
QI06AI03 Live feline panleucopenia virus/parvovirus + live feline rhinotracheitis virus + live feline calicivirus + live feline leukaemia virus + inactivated chlamydia

QI06AJ Live and inactivated viral and bacterial vaccines
QI06AJ01 Live feline rhinotracheitis virus + live feline calicivirus + inactivated feline panleucopenia virus/parvovirus + live chlamydia
QI06AJ02 Live feline rhinotracheitis virus + inactivated feline calicivirus antigen + live chlamydia
QI06AJ03 Live feline rhinotracheitis virus + inactivated feline calicivirus antigen + live feline panleucopenia virus/parvovirus + live chlamydia
QI06AJ04 Live feline rhinotracheitis virus + live feline calicivirus + live chlamydia + inactivated feline panleucopenia virus/inactivated feline leukaemia virus
QI06AJ05 Live feline rhinotracheitis virus + inactivated feline calicivirus antigen + live feline panleucopenia virus / parvovirus + live chlamydia + feline leukaemia recombinant live canarypox virus

QI06AK Inactivated viral and live bacterial vaccines
Empty group

QI06AL Inactivated viral and inactivated bacterial vaccines
QI06AL01 Feline panleucopenia virus/parvovirus + feline rhinotracheitis virus + feline calicivirus + feline infectious leukaemia virus + chlamydia
QI06AL02 Feline panleucopenia virus/parvovirus + feline rhinotracheitis virus + feline calicivirus + inactivated chlamydia
QI06AL03 Feline rhinotracheitis virus + feline calicivirus + chlamydia

QI06AM Antisera, immunoglobulin preparations, and antitoxins
QI06AM01 Feline panleucopenia virus/parvovirus antiserum + feline rhinotracheitis virus antiserum + feline calicivirus antiserum

QI06AN Live parasitic vaccines
Empty group

QI06AO Inactivated parasitic vaccines
Empty group

QI06AP Live fungal vaccines
QI06AP01 Trichophyton
QI06AP02 Trichophyton + microsporum

QI06AQ Inactivated fungal vaccines
QI06AQ01 Trichophyton + microsporum
QI06AQ02 Microsporum

QI06AR In vivo diagnostic preparations
Empty group

QI06AS Allergens
Empty group

QI06AT Colostrum preparations and substitutes
Empty group

QI06AU Other live vaccines
Empty group

QI06AV Other inactivated vaccines
Empty group

QI06AX Other immunologicals
Empty group

QI06X Felidae, others

Empty group

See also
 Feline vaccination

References

I06